Two Players from the Bench is a Croatian comedy-drama film directed by Dejan Šorak. It was released in 2005.

Cast
 Goran Navojec - Ante Jukić
 Borko Perić - Duško Katran
 Tarik Filipović - Antiša
 Dora Lipovčan - Stela
 Renne Gjoni - The Hague Prosecutor

Sources

External links
 

2005 films
2000s Croatian-language films
2005 comedy-drama films
Croatian comedy-drama films
2005 comedy films
2005 drama films